Palawan's at-large congressional district refers to the lone congressional district of the Philippines in the province of Palawan, formerly Paragua, for various national legislatures before 1987. The province elected its representatives province-wide at-large from its reorganization under Article 6 of the Decreto de 18 junio de 1898 y las instrucciones sobre el régimen de las provincias y pueblos for the Malolos Congress in 1898 until the creation of a first and second district on February 2, 1987. It was a single-member district throughout the ten legislatures of the Insular Government of the Philippine Islands from 1907 to 1935, the three legislatures of the Philippine Commonwealth from 1935 to 1946, the seven congresses of the Third Philippine Republic from 1946 to 1972, and the national parliament of the Fourth Philippine Republic from 1984 to 1986.

Palawan has had two instances in its history where more than one member represented it in the national legislatures. The province, still separate from Calamianes and Balabac, sent two representatives to the National Assembly (Malolos Congress) of the First Philippine Republic from 1898 to 1901 and two representatives to the National Assembly of the Second Philippine Republic from 1943 to 1944.

After 1986, all representatives were elected from its congressional districts.

Representation history

See also
Legislative districts of Palawan

References

Former congressional districts of the Philippines
Politics of Palawan
1898 establishments in the Philippines
1986 disestablishments in the Philippines
At-large congressional districts of the Philippines
Congressional districts of Mimaropa
Constituencies established in 1898
Constituencies disestablished in 1901
Constituencies established in 1907
Constituencies disestablished in 1972
Constituencies established in 1984
Constituencies disestablished in 1986